IESCO may refer to:
 International Ecological Safety Collaborative Organization
 Islamabad Electric Supply Company